Top Chef Canada: Season 9 is the ninth season of the Canadian reality television series Top Chef Canada and was first broadcast on Food Network. The new season was first announced by Food Network Canada on March 31, 2021. The season was filmed in Toronto, Ontario and the finale was shot at the Four Seasons hotel in the city's downtown core. Season nine features 11 chefs of various backgrounds considered to be the next generation of culinary stars in Canada.

The season reflected on the impact of the COVID-19 pandemic on the food industry. Chefs wore masks when shopping for produce, travelling between destinations and during several challenges, which were adapted to follow pandemic restrictions, most notably with "Takeout Wars," an adaptation of the classic challenge "Restaurant Wars," where chefs conducted a takeout service instead of a pop-up restaurant, and where the Judges ate at resident judge Janet Zuccarini's own home. 

Season 9 featured Eden Grinshpan again as host, and kept all of its mainstay judges, including Head Judge Mark McEwan, along with resident judges Christ Nuttall-Smith, Mijune Pak and Janet Zuccarini, who rotated through judging elimination challenges, with at least one resident judge present per episode, but at times featured two or all resident judges on some given episodes.

Top Chef Canada: Season 9 premiered on April 19, 2021, and concluded on June 7, 2021. In the season finale, Erika Kerbelnik was declared the winner over runner-up Kym Nguyen. For winning the competition, Karbelnik was awarded the grand prize of $100,000 (CAD) and a new Lexus branded vehicle.

Contestants

Eleven chefs competed in season 9. Contestants are listed in the alphabetical order of their surnames.

Galasa Aden, 27, TBC, Calgary, AB
Andrea Alridge, 30, Chef de Cuisine, Vancouver, BC
Emily Butcher, 30, Chef de Cuisine, Winnipeg, MB
Aicia Colacci, 40, Private Chef, Montreal, QC
Siobhan Detkavich, 21, Chef de Partie, Kelowna, BC
Jae-Anthony Dougan, 34, TBC, Ottawa, ON
Alex Edmonson, 28, Private Chef, Calgary, AB
Erica Karbelnik, 30, Executive Chef, Toronto, ON
Josh Karbelnik, 30, Chef de Cuisine, Toronto, ON
Stéphane "Steph" Levac, 41, Executive Chef, Kentville, NS
Kym Nguyen, 34, Sous Chef, Vancouver, BC

Contestant progress 

 (WINNER) The chef won the season and was crowned Top Chef.
 (RUNNER-UP) The chef was a runner-up for the season.
 (WIN) The chef won that episode's Elimination Challenge.
 (TEAM WIN) The team that won that episode's Elimination Challenge.
 (HIGH) The chef was selected as one of the top entries in the Elimination Challenge, but did not win.
 (IMMUNE) The chef was immune from elimination, and exempted from cooking during this Elimination Challenge.
 (LOW) The chef was selected as one of the bottom entries in the Elimination Challenge, but was not eliminated.
 (OUT) The chef lost that week's Elimination Challenge and was eliminated from the competition.
 (IN) The chef neither won nor lost that week's Elimination Challenge. They also were not up to be eliminated.

Episodes

References 

Canada, Season 9
2021 Canadian television seasons